The 2023 Women's European Volleyball Championship will be the 33rd edition of the Women's European Volleyball Championship, organised by Europe's governing volleyball body, the CEV. For the third consecutive time, the Women's EuroVolley will be held in four countries: Belgium, Italy, Germany and Estonia.

Qualification

Pools composition
The drawing of lots was combined with a seeding of National Federations and performed as follows:
 The 4 organizers were seeded in Preliminary pools. Belgium in Pool A, Italy in Pool B, Germany in Pool C and Estonia in Pool D.
 The finalists from the previous edition were drawn in different Preliminary pools, meaning that Italy could not be paired with Serbia.
 The organizers could select one team to join their pools, as a result, Slovenia joined Belgium in Pool A, Romania joined Italy in Pool B, Azerbaijan joined Germany in Pool C and Finland joined Estonia in Pool D.
 According to the CEV National Team ranking list, the 16 remaining teams were seeded by descending order in a number of cups that equals the number of Preliminary pools.

Draw
The drawing of lots was held on 16 November 2022 in Naples, Italy.

Pool standing procedure
 Number of matches won
 Match points
 Sets ratio
 Points ratio
 If the tie continues as per the point ratio between two teams, the priority will be given to the team which won the match between them. When the tie in points ratio is between three or more teams, a new classification of these teams in the terms of points 1, 2, 3 and 4 will be made taking into consideration only the matches in which they were opposed to each other.

Match won 3–0 or 3–1: 3 match points for the winner, 0 match points for the loser
Match won 3–2: 2 match points for the winner, 1 match point for the loser

Preliminary round
All times are local.
The top four teams in each pool will qualify for the final round.

Pool A

|}

|}

Pool B

|}

|}

Pool C

|}

|}

Pool D

|}

|}

Final round
All times are local.

Round of 16
|}

Quarterfinals
|}

Semifinals
|}

3rd place match
|}

Final
|}

See also
2023 Men's European Volleyball Championship

References

External links
Official website

2023
European Championships
European Volleyball Championship
International volleyball competitions hosted by Belgium
International volleyball competitions hosted by Estonia
International volleyball competitions hosted by Germany
European Championship,2023
2023 in Belgian sport
2023 in Estonian sport
2023 in German women's sport
2023 in Italian women's sport
2020s in Belgian women's sport
August 2023 sports events in Europe
September 2023 sports events in Europe